Bangkok Dangerous is a 2008 American action thriller film written and directed by the Pang Brothers, and starring Nicolas Cage. It is a remake of the Pangs' 1999 debut Bangkok Dangerous, a Thai film, for which Cage's production company, Saturn Films, purchased the remake rights.

Known by its working title, Big Hit in Bangkok, and also as Time to Kill, it began filming in Bangkok in August 2006. The film was financed by Initial Entertainment Group, and Lionsgate Films acquired its North America distribution rights.

Bangkok Dangerous was released on September 5, 2008. Upon release, the film became a major failure, grossing $42 million against a production budget of $45 million as well as receiving negative reviews from critics which praised Cage's performance and the action sequences yet criticized the direction, editing and screenwriting.

Plot
Joe is a professional freelance contract killer who works strictly by the rules; never socializing outside his work, staying secluded in quiet spots, never interacting or meeting with his handlers and always leaving on time without a trace. He usually hires young pickpockets or small-time criminals as his local help, whom he usually murders after the end of the job to prevent any identification. He uses multiple aliases and also has middlemen between him and his handlers. He also carries a watch to perform a hit in specific time and correctly visualizes his every target.

After completing a hit in Prague and killing his current help, Joe travels to Bangkok for an assignment to assassinate four people for notorious Bangkok crime boss Surat, whom he never meets. Joe occasionally provides insight via voiceover narration throughout the film. He hires a local Thai pickpocket named Kong, who has simple English knowledge, as his go-between in Bangkok, a condition of the contract being that the gang will never meet Joe. Contracts from the Bangkok gangsters are passed to Kong one by one via a nightclub dancer, Aom. Joe's first execution in Bangkok is done on motorcycle; when the target car stops at a red light, Joe kills all the occupants with a MAC-11.

Kong retrieves information about the second target, again via Aom, and the pair become friendlier with every contact. Before Joe executes his mission, Kong informs him of the target, Pramod Juntasa, another notorious gang lord and Surat's rival crime boss who acts as a sex trafficker, buying young girls from impoverished parents and selling them for sex. Joe sneaks into the target's penthouse and drowns him in his pool. Unsatisfied with Kong's assistance, Joe contemplates killing him, but after a brief confrontation when Kong is ambushed by local gangsters regarding a briefcase containing information files of Surat's/Joe's targets, he instead decides to act as Kong's mentor and trains him for self-defense.

Midway through the movie, Joe meets Fon, a deaf-mute pharmacist, with whom he becomes intrigued after a brief consultation. Joe later returns to the pharmacy to invite Fon out for dinner. Soon after Joe falls for Fon and meets her mother, the affair is cut short when he shoots and kills two assailants in Fon's presence. Blood splatters on Fon, and she runs off, trembling and traumatized by the violent deaths. Feeling betrayed, Fon cannot forgive Joe and ends their relationship.

Before the third kill, the gang attempts to identify Joe, and he warns them off. For the third execution that takes place at the Damnoen Saduak floating market, Kong assists Joe. The kill does not go as planned, and the target, a playboy and a criminal underworld associate, nearly gets away but Joe manages to catch and assassinate him. Before beginning his last mission Joe visits Fon, presumably to say goodbye. She initially ignores him but as Joe begins to drive away she runs after his car.

His fourth target is the Prime Minister of Thailand, who is revered by many but a great hindrance to Surat due to his hard-line crackdown on organized crime. Joe is about to make the kill when he has second thoughts, is spotted, and escapes through a panicking crowd. Meanwhile, the gang has abducted Aom and Kong with plans to execute them. Joe, now a target, is attacked at his house by four of Surat's henchmen. He uses explosives to take them out and is faced with the choice of rescuing Kong or leaving the country unharmed. Joe decides to rescue Kong, so he sets off to the gang's headquarters with one of the half-alive attackers.

Joe goes to the gang's headquarters, kills most of the gang including Surat's underboss/bodyguard (who is blown into half by explosives), and saves Kong and Aom. The fearful gang leader flees to his car with three other accomplices. Joe spots him and shoots the gang members, then gets into the back seat with Surat. As the police arrive at the location, Joe realizes he has only one bullet. He puts his head adjacent to Surat's, puts the gun up to his temple and pulls the trigger, killing himself and Surat.

Alternate ending
An alternate ending to the theatrical version shows that before Joe kills himself in the original version, Kong steals a police car and comes to his rescue. He kills Surat and runs to the stolen car (although he is shot once in the arm). After eluding the police officers, they hide in a neighborhood a few meters away from Surat's headquarters. As locals come out to investigate the commotion, Kong reveals Joe is the man who killed Surat. They help him recuperate while one local remarks Surat's bad reputation, adding his death marks an end to his crimes and atrocities in their place. Kong then takes Joe to a boatman and gives him his passports, so he may flee the country. Joe thanks Kong for his assistance and gives him a bank account number with "a bonus", stating he was a good student. Joe then departs, with the camera focused on Kong (from Joe's perspective, similar to the original ending).

Cast
 Nicolas Cage as Joe 
 Shahkrit Yamnarm as Kong
 James Wearing Smith as Chicago  
 Charlie Yeung as Fon
 Nirattisai Kaljaruek as Surat
 Panward Hemmanee as Aom
 Peter Shadrin as Anton
 Dom Hetrakul as Aran
 Napassakorn Midaim as Kong's Brother

Production
The original film's main character is a deaf hitman, whose disability makes him a fearless, unflinching gunman. That character has been changed in the remake.
"We'd like to keep him the same, but we understand that from a marketing point of view Nic needs to have some lines," Oxide was quoted as saying in The New York Times. "So what we’re going to do is transform his girlfriend instead into a deaf-mute. This switch will maintain the drama of communication between the two main characters."

The Soi Cowboy entertainment district was among Thai locations used for filming.

Release

Box office
The film grossed US$42.5 million, of which $15.3 million was from the US. The film grossed US$7.8 million on its opening weekend, making it the first film since Dickie Roberts: Former Child Star to debut at number 1 with such a low gross. Lionsgate distribution topper Steve Rothenberg said, "It will be a nicely profitable film for us." The film's budget was $45 million.

Home media release
Bangkok Dangerous was released on DVD and Blu-ray on January 6, 2009. As of December 1, 2009, 760,178 units have been sold, gathering US$15,058,164 in revenue.

Reception
The film has an 9% approval rating on Rotten Tomatoes, based on 94 reviews with an average rating of 3.50 out of 10. The website's critics consensus reads: "With murky cinematography, a meandering pace, a dull storyline and rather wooden performances, the Pang Brothers' Hollywood remake of Bangkok Dangerous is unsuccessful." On Metacritic, the film has a weighted average score of 24 out of 100 based on reviews from 16 critics, indicating "generally unfavorable reviews".

See also
 List of films featuring the deaf and hard of hearing

References

External links
 
 
 
 
 
 

2008 films
2008 action thriller films
2008 crime thriller films
2000s crime action films
American action thriller films
American crime thriller films
American crime action films
American gangster films
American remakes of Thai films
Films about contract killing
Films set in Bangkok
Films set in Prague
Films set in Thailand
Films shot in the Czech Republic
Films shot in Thailand
Initial Entertainment Group films
Murder–suicide in films
Lionsgate films
Saturn Films films
Films scored by Brian Tyler
Films produced by Nicolas Cage
Films about deaf people
2000s English-language films
2000s American films